Lydia Purdy Hess (April 8, 1866 – November 30, 1936) was an American artist best known for her Portrait of Miss E. H., which was exhibited at the Paris Salon de la Societé Nationale des Beaux-Arts, the Pennsylvania Academy of Fine Arts, and the World's Columbian Exposition in Chicago in 1893.

Early life and education
Lydia Purdy Hess was born on April 8, 1866, in Newaygo, Michigan. She attended the School of the Art Institute of Chicago, graduating in 1886. According to School of the Art Institute records, she studied with Désiré Laugée at Académie Delécluse, and taught at the School from 1891 to 1895. Hess also served as assistant to the sculptor Lorado Taft. In 1894, Hess was in residence at St. Charles, Illinois.

Career 
Hess's Portrait of Miss E. H. was exhibited at the Paris Salon de la Societé Nationale des Beaux-Arts in 1892; at the Pennsylvania Academy of Fine Arts in Philadelphia early in 1893; and at the World's Columbian Exposition in Chicago later in 1893. The oil painting is on exhibit at Orchard Lawn, the home of the Mineral Point Historical Society. The subject of the portrait, Miss Ena Hutchison, attended school at the Art Institute of Chicago with Hess. They traveled to Paris together in 1891 to study at the Académie Julian, one of the first art schools to admit women.

Hess married Charles Doak Lowry on June 28, 1895, in Chicago, Illinois. On their two-month honeymoon, the couple floated down the Ohio River from Pittsburgh, Pennsylvania to Ripley, Ohio in a boat called The Double Ell; Hess sketched and painted. Lydia and Charles Lowry went on to have five children, the youngest of whom was noted biochemist Oliver Howe Lowry.

In 1891, Hess began her studies at the Académie Delécluse in France, and later she attended classes with James Abbott McNeill Whistler.

Death 
Hess died on November 30, 1936, in Evanston, Illinois.

References

External links
 

1866 births
1936 deaths
19th-century American painters
American women painters
Artists from Michigan
People from Newaygo, Michigan
School of the Art Institute of Chicago alumni
Académie Delécluse alumni
19th-century American women